Juan Carlos Onganía Carballo (17 March 1914 – 8 June 1995) was President of Argentina from 29 June 1966 to 8 June 1970. He rose to power as dictator after toppling the president Arturo Illia in a coup d'état self-named Revolución Argentina.

Onganía wanted to install in Argentina a paternalistic dictatorship modeled on the Spanish Francisco Franco. While preceding military coups in Argentina were aimed at establishing temporary, transitional juntas, the Revolución Argentina headed by Onganía aimed at establishing a new political and social order, opposed both to liberal democracy and to communism, which gave to the Armed Forces of Argentina a leading role in the political and economic operation of the country. Onganía implemented a rigid censorship that reached the press and all cultural manifestations such as cinema, theater and even poetry.

When the Armed Forces replaced the radical president in government with General Juan Carlos Onganía, they interrupted an attempt to set up the republic and led the country to the violence of the 1970s and subsequent decline.

Presidency

Economic and social policies
While preceding military coups in Argentina were aimed at establishing temporary, transitional juntas, the Revolución Argentina headed by Onganía aimed at establishing a new political and social order, opposed both to liberal democracy and to communism, which gave to the Armed Forces of Argentina a leading role in the political and economic operation of the country. The political scientist Guillermo O'Donnell named this type of regime "authoritarian-bureaucratic state", in reference both to the Revolución Argentina, the Brazilian military regime (1964–1985), Augusto Pinochet's regime (starting in 1973) and Juan María Bordaberry's regime in Uruguay.

While Chief of the Army in 1963, Onganía helped crush the 1963 Argentine Navy Revolt by mobilizing troops that seized rebelling Navy bases. However, he demonstrated a disregard for civil authority when he initially refused to call off his troops after a ceasefire agreement had been approved by President José María Guido and his cabinet, and was only convinced to follow orders after a tense meeting.

As military dictator, Onganía suspended political parties and supported a policy of Participacionismo (Participationism, supported by the trade unionist José Alonso and then by the general secretary of the CGT-Azopardo, Augusto Vandor), by which representatives of various interest groups such as industry, labor, and agriculture, would form committees to advise the government. However these committees were largely appointed by the dictator himself. Onganía also suspended the right to strike (Law 16,936) and supported a corporatist economic and social policy, enforced particularly in Cordoba by the appointed governor, Carlos Caballero.

Onganía's Minister of Economy, Adálbert Krieger Vasena, decreed a wage freeze (amid 30% inflation) and a 40% devaluation, which adversely impacted the state of the Argentine economy (agriculture in particular), favoring foreign capital. Krieger Vasena suspended collective labour conventions, reformed the Fossil Fuels Law which had established a partial monopoly of the Yacimientos Petrolíferos Fiscales (YPF) state enterprise and also signed a law facilitating the expulsion of tenants in cases of non-payment of rent.

Cultural and education policy

Onganía's rule signified an end to university autonomy, which had been achieved by the University Reform of 1918.

Barely a month into his administration, he was responsible for the violation of university autonomy in the so-called La Noche de los Bastones Largos ("The Night of the Long Police Batons") in which he ordered police to invade the Faculty of Sciences of the University of Buenos Aires. Students and professors were beaten up and arrested. Many were later forced to leave the country, beginning a "brain drain" that adversely affects Argentine academia to this day.

Onganía also ordered repression on all forms of "immoralism", proscribing miniskirts, long hair for boys, and all avant-garde artistic movements. This moral campaign favorized the radicalization of the middle classes, who were very over-represented in universities. In 1969, Ongania dedicated the country to the Immaculate Heart of Mary.

Protests
Eventually, this position was opposed by the other factions in the military, which felt that its influence in government would be diminished. At the end of May 1968, General Julio Alsogaray dissented from Onganía, and rumors spread about a possible coup d'état, Alsogaray leading the conservative opposition to Onganía. Finally, at the end of the month, Onganía dismissed the leaders of the Armed Forces: Alejandro Lanusse replaced Julio Alsogaray, Pedro Gnavi replaced Benigno Varela, and Jorge Martínez Zuviría replaced Adolfo Alvarez.

Also, Ongania's ruthless government was weakened by a popular uprising of workers and students that took place in the whole of the country, in particular in the interior, in cities such as Córdoba in 1969 (known as "El Cordobazo") or Rosario (the Rosariazo).

The dominant military faction, led by General Lanusse, demanded that Onganía resign. When he refused, he was toppled by a military junta.

Later life
After his departure from office the general decided to retire definitively to a Buenos Aires estate. He was critical of the human rights violations during the National Reorganization Process, the name given to the military dictatorship of Videla et al between 1976 and 1983.

In 1989 the Constitutional Nationalist Party proposed him to be a candidate, but he did not reach an agreement and remained away from politics. For the 1995 elections he was a candidate for president for the Front for Patriotic Solidarity after criticizing President Carlos Menem for the widespread corruption in his government. Before the election Onganía resigned from the ticket due to health issues, although his name continued to appear on the ballot.

He died of a stroke at the age of 81 on June 8, 1995.

See also
Jorge Rafael Videla – Argentine military officer who would later succeed Ongania.

References

External links

 31 yrs after

1914 births
1995 deaths
Argentine anti-communists
Argentine generals
Argentine people of Basque descent
Argentine Roman Catholics
Leaders who took power by coup
Burials at La Chacarita Cemetery
Leaders ousted by a coup
People from Marcos Paz Partido
Presidents of Argentina